Thomas Edwin Higham (22 December 1887 – after 1920), commonly known as Gunner Higham, was an English professional footballer who made 124 Southern League appearances playing as a left half for Brighton & Hove Albion.

Life and career
Higham was born in Daventry, Northamptonshire. He was a serving soldier with the Royal Field Artilleryhence the nickname "Gunner"stationed at Preston Barracks, Brighton, when he signed amateur forms with Southern League club Brighton & Hove Albion in 1907. When he finished his term, he signed as a professional in January 1909, and was a first-team regular for the next two-and-a-half seasons. Higham remained an Army reservist, so was called up at the outbreak of the First World War and missed the entire 1914–15 season. He was posted to France, and wrote letters home from the front that were published in the local press. He returned to the Albion team for 1919–20, their last Southern League season before their admission to the newly formed Football League Third Division, at the end of which he was awarded a benefit match; the proceeds of £605 was then a record for a Southern League benefit.

References

1887 births
Year of death missing
People from Daventry
English footballers
Association football wing halves
Brighton & Hove Albion F.C. players
Southern Football League players
Royal Field Artillery soldiers
British Army personnel of World War I